Saint Peter is a 1608 oil on canvas painting produced by El Greco in Toledo towards the end of his life. It is now in the Monasterio del Escorial near Madrid.

It shows the apostle standing atop a mountain holding a set of keys, referring to Christ's commission to Peter as "the rock upon which I will build my church. I will give you the keys of the kingdom of heaven." (Matthew 16: 18-19). The heavy drapery and the disproportion between the head and the body are typical of the artist.

Bibliography 
  ÁLVAREZ LOPERA, José, El Greco, Madrid, Arlanza, 2005, Biblioteca «Descubrir el Arte», (colección «Grandes maestros»). .
  SCHOLZ-HÄNSEL, Michael, El Greco, Colonia, Taschen, 2003. .

External links
 

1608 paintings
El Greco
Paintings by El Greco
Spanish royal collection
Paintings in the collection of El Escorial